Mohammad Talib (Arabic:محمد طالب) (born 14 May 1988) is an Emirati footballer. He currently plays for Al Jazirah Al-Hamra as a left back.

Career
He formerly played for Al Ahli, Al-Rams, Masafi, Dibba Al-Hisn, Al Urooba, Dubai, and Hatta.

External links

References

1988 births
Living people
Emirati footballers
Al Ahli Club (Dubai) players
Al Rams Club players
Masafi Club players
Dibba Al-Hisn Sports Club players
Al Urooba Club players
Dubai CSC players
Hatta Club players
Al Hamriyah Club players
Al Dhaid SC players
Al Jazirah Al Hamra Club players
UAE Pro League players
UAE First Division League players
Association football fullbacks
Place of birth missing (living people)